Dina Protsenko (1926-2006) was a Soviet-Ukrainian Politician (Communist).

She was appointed Chairperson of the State-Committee of the Protection of Nature in 1975.

References

1926 births
2006 deaths
20th-century Ukrainian women politicians
Soviet women in politics
Communist Party of Ukraine politicians
Women government ministers of Ukraine